Hettiadurage Sangeeth Deshan Fernando (born 24 April 1998) is a Sri Lankan cricketer. He made his List A debut on 23 December 2019, for Kandy Customs Cricket Club in the 2019–20 Invitation Limited Over Tournament. He made his Twenty20 debut on 4 March 2021, for Bloomfield Cricket and Athletic Club in the 2020–21 SLC Twenty20 Tournament.

References

External links
 

1998 births
Living people
Sri Lankan cricketers
Bloomfield Cricket and Athletic Club cricketers
Kandy Customs Sports Club cricketers
Place of birth missing (living people)